The Sedona International Film Festival (SIFF) is an annual, eight-day film festival in Sedona, Arizona. The festival was founded in 1994.

The Sedona Film Festival screens feature films, documentary films, short films, animated films, and student films. In the festival workshops, organised by Academy Award-winner Frank Warner, award-winning industry professionals teach a new generation of filmmakers.

Genghis Blues (1999), Spellbound, and Why Can't We Be a Family Again? (2002) are among the Academy Award nominees screened at the SIFF. The 2004 festival premiered What the Bleep Do We Know!?, Inside Job, and Another Year. Robert Osborn has presented several film classics, such as The Third Man (1949), Sunset Boulevard (1950), Some Like It Hot (1959), North by Northwest (1959).

Some of the guests and honorees of past festivals are Ed Asner, Rick Schroder, Andrew McCarthy, Donald O'Connor, Ann Miller, Sean Young, Dean Stockwell, Linda Gray, Ted Danson, Mary Steenburgen, Diane Ladd, Amanda Plummer, Wendy Malick, Jane Powell, Nick Nolte, Scott Baio, Tony Curtis, Jonathan Winters, Nicolas Cage, Rip Torn, Rita Rudner, David Rasche, Phil Rosenthal, and Jena Malone. The 2010 honoree was Michael Moore.

Award categories

Directors' Choice
 Best Feature Film
 Best Documentary Film
 Best Humanitarian Film
 Best Short Film
 Best Foreign Language Short Film
 Best Animated Film
 Discovery Film Award
 Outstanding Directing for “Local Color”

Audience Choice
 Best Feature Film
 Best Documentary Film
 Best Student Short Film
 Best Short Film
 Best Animated Film

Excellence in Filmmaking

External links
 sedonafilmfestival.org, official website
 

Film festivals in Arizona
Tourist attractions in Coconino County, Arizona
Tourist attractions in Yavapai County, Arizona
Sedona, Arizona
1994 establishments in Arizona
Film festivals established in 1994
History of Yavapai County, Arizona